is a Japanese actress. Her career began in 1998, when she appeared in several television commercials. At the age of 18 she played the female lead in the 2000 film Uzumaki, and she also had a leading role in the 2012 film Emperor.

Filmography

Notes

References

External links

Living people
Japanese film actresses
21st-century Japanese actresses
1982 births
Actresses from Tokyo